Hatefilled Vengeance is an EP by goregrind band Regurgitate, released in 2002 by Relapse Records. It contains some previously released tracks, along with previously unreleased tracks. All previously released tracks were re-recorded for this EP. Tracks 1 - 8 are from Effortless Regurgitation of Bright Red Blood, and tracks 9 and 10 are from the Concrete Human Torture demo.

Track list
 Confluent Macular Drug Eruption - 0:22
 Vulva Fermentation - 0:30
 Complete Rectal Prolapse - 1:00
 Testicular Trauma - 1:15
 Cloudy Grayish Vomitus - 0:19
 Fleshmangler - 1:07
 Bulging Vaginal Septum - 0:37
 Bleeding Peptic Ulcer - 0:47
 Deranged Menarche Injection - 0:56
 Drastical Decapitation - 0:58
 Emethic Jizz Treatment - 1:04
 Destined To Burn - 1:31
 Hatefilled Vengeance - 0:39
 666 Casualties - 2:23
 Deathlike Incest - 1:29
 Choke That Piggy - 0:43
 Devastation And Nuclear Apocalypse - 0:35
 Disciples Of Obliteration - 0:52

Personnel
 Rikard Jansson - Vocals
 Urban Skytt - Guitar, bass
 Jocke Pettersson - Drums

Regurgitate (band) albums
2002 EPs
Relapse Records EPs